Middleton is a village and civil parish in the Braintree District of Essex, England. The River Stour also forms the eastern border.

In the north of the parish at Middleton Hall Farm is small light industrial and services park which includes a vehicle sales company and the headquarters of a turkey farm. This was the only farm and only trade listed in 1882 and 1914. By 1894 a carpenter was trading, and in 1902, a baker. The parish contained a mixed National School for 40 children, built in 1875. This had become a Public Elementary School by 1914. Earlier, in 1818, the parish population of 90 had no school.

Parish soil was of clay, loam and gravel, on which was grown wheat, barley, beans and turnips. Between 1881 and 1911, the population dropped from 165 to 133.

The Parish Church of All Saints', which dates to the mid-12th century, is a Grade I listed building. Within the church chancel is a 14th-century Purbeck marble figurative floor slab to the memory of a rector of Middleton, died 1349. The parish register dates to 1700. The church seats 150. All Saints' Church was restored in the 19th century, when the bell turret and south porch were rebuilt, a vestry added to the north, and an organ chamber installed. In 1882 an oil-on-canvas painting of the Annunciation was reported to be above All Saints' chancel arch, which might have been the work of the 16th-century artist Andrea Schiavone. The rectory house was noted between 1882 and 1902, but not in 1914, as "beautifully situated with a small park in front and contains a splendid collection of oil and water colour paintings by English, Dutch, Flemish, French and Italian masters".

At the centre of Middleton Hall Farm is Middleton Hall, built in 1864 but today unlisted; it is part surrounded by a mutilated rectangular moat as a listed monument.

References

External links

Villages in Essex
Braintree District